Northwest Independent School District (Northwest ISD) is a rapidly growing North Texas public school district with its headquarters in the city of Fort Worth, Texas (USA). with a Justin postal address. The school district is named for its location in the northwestern area of the Dallas Fort Worth Metroplex. The school district lies in three North Texas counties: Denton County, Tarrant County and Wise County.

The district serves the cities of Justin, Roanoke, Trophy Club, Northlake, Marshall Creek, Corral City, and small portions of Flower Mound and Southlake in Denton County. The Wise County towns of Aurora, Rhome, Pecan Acres, Newark, and portions of New Fairview also lie within the district. The Tarrant County portion of the district includes Haslet, Avondale, parts of Westlake, Keller, and Fort Worth. In all, the district is approximately 234 square miles.

As of September 2021, Northwest ISD educates over 27,000 students in its thirty educational campuses. Northwest ISD is expected to have up to 35,000 students by the early 2020s, and is the first fastest-growing school district in North Texas.  There are 108 active housing communities within the attendance boundaries of Northwest ISD.

For the 2013-2014 school year, the school district was rated as "meeting standard" by the Texas Education Agency, which is currently the highest ranking given under the STAAR system.

Schools

High schools
Grades 9-12
Northwest High School (Justin)
Byron Nelson High School (Trophy Club)
V.R. Eaton High School (Fort Worth) (Haslet mailing address)
James M. Steele Early College High School (Roanoke)

Middle Schools
Grades 6-8
Chisholm Trail Middle School (Rhome)
Gene Pike Middle School (Justin)
John M. Tidwell Middle School (Fort Worth)(Roanoke Mailing Address)
Medlin Middle School (Trophy Club)
Truett Wilson Middle School (Fort Worth)(Haslet mailing address)
Leo Adams Middle School (Fort Worth)(Haslet mailing address)

Elementary Schools
Grades K-5
Carl E. Schulter Elementary School (Fort Worth)(Haslet Mailing Address)
Clara Love Elementary School (Fort Worth)(Justin Mailing Address)
Haslet Elementary School (Haslet)
Lizzie Curtis Elementary School (Fort Worth)
J. Lyndal Hughes Elementary School (Fort Worth)(Roanoke Mailing Address)
J.C. Thompson Elementary School (Fort Worth)
Justin Elementary School (Justin)
Kay Granger Elementary School (Fort Worth)
Lakeview Elementary School (Trophy Club)
O.A. Peterson Elementary School (Fort Worth)
Prairie View Elementary School (Rhome)
Roanoke Elementary School (Roanoke)
Samuel Beck Elementary School (Trophy Club)
2008 National Blue Ribbon School
Sendera Ranch Elementary School (Fort Worth)
Seven Hills Elementary School (Newark)
Sonny & Allegra Nance Elementary School (Fort Worth)
W.R. Hatfield Elementary School (Fort Worth)(Justin mailing address)
Wayne A. Cox Elementary School (Roanoke)

External links

Northwest ISD

References

School districts in Fort Worth, Texas
School districts in Denton County, Texas
School districts in Tarrant County, Texas
School districts in Wise County, Texas